Puxi (Chinese: , p Pǔxī, Shanghainese Phu上-shi平, lit "Huangpu West Bank") is the historic center of Shanghai, China, and remains the home of approximately 48% of Shanghai's residents in an area of 288 km². Puxi is distinguished from Pudong to its east, which is separated from it by the Huangpu River. Despite the growing importance of Pudong's Lujiazui area, Puxi remains Shanghai's cultural, residential and commercial center.

Administratively, Puxi consists of a number of districts including Yangpu, Hongkou, Putuo, Changning, Xuhui, Jing'an and Huangpu.

Culture and entertainment
Puxi is, along with Pudong, the entertainment and cultural center of Shanghai. 

Puxi has the most emblematic shopping centers and cultural centers. The main shopping centers (including East Nanjing Pedestrian Road, Central Huaihai Road, Qipu Road Apparel City, and Xujiahui), the major bar streets (Hengshan, Maoming, and Julu Roads), the Shanghai Zoo and cultural centers such as The Bund, the Shanghai Grand Theatre, and the Shanghai Museum are all located in Puxi.  

On the other hand, Pudong has the most emblematic parks and skyscrapers. For instance, the biggest park in all of Shanghai, the Century Park, is located in Pudong. Shanghai Disneyland Park is too located in Pudong. Pudong also has the tallest skyscrapers such as the Oriental Pearl Tower, the Shanghai World Financial Center and the Shanghai Tower (the tallest skyscraper in Shanghai).

Corresponding Administrative Zones

source: https://www.citypopulation.de/en/china/shanghai/admin/

Transportation
Shanghai's older airport, Shanghai Hongqiao International Airport, is located in Puxi. All international flights, including regional flights to Hong Kong and Macao, were moved to Shanghai Pudong International Airport when the latter opened in 1999. From October 2007, a limited number of international flights will commence from Hongqiao.

Almost all lines on the Shanghai Metro (with the exceptions of Lines 5 and 6) pass by Puxi.

Pudong and Puxi are connected by several tunnels, four major bridges, and Lines 2, 4, 7, 8 and 9 on the Shanghai Metro.

The Shanghai railway station and Shanghai South railway station are also located in Puxi.

References

Geography of Shanghai
Central business districts in China